Aung Toe (Burmese: အောင်တိုး ; 1924/5 – 24 May 2021) was Chief Justice of the Supreme Court of Myanmar (Burma) from 1988 to 2011. Aung Toe served as Chief Justice of Myanmar for a total of twenty-two and-a-half-years, making him the longest-serving Chief Justice of Myanmar in the history of post-independence Myanmar.

He said, "although there may be some diversity between countries of ASEAN, we share the common sentiments of loving kindness, compassion and desire to help one another in times of need. They represent the noble spirit of the peoples of Southeast Asia".

References

1920s births
2021 deaths
Burmese judges
University of Yangon alumni